These Days may refer to:

Music

Albums
 These Days (Bon Jovi album), and the title song (see below)
 These Days Tour, a 1995–1996 tour by Bon Jovi in support of the above album
 These Days (Crystal Gayle album), 1980
 These Days (Family Brown album)
 These Days (Goodness album)
 These Days (The Grapes of Wrath album), 1991
 These Days (Vince Gill album), 2006, and the title song
These Days (Paul Carrack album)
 These Days (The Virginia Sessions), 2007 album by Pat McGee Band
 These Days: Live in Concert, 2004 live album by Powderfinger, and the title song (see below)
 These Days... (album), 2014 album by Ab-Soul
 These Days, by Sandi Patty
 These Days, EP by Spencer P. Jones
 These Days, album by Mike Stud

Songs
"These Days" (Bardot song)
"These Days" (Bon Jovi song)
"These Days" (Brian Kennedy song)
"These Days" (Gyroscope song)
"These Days" (Jackson Browne song)
"These Days" (MacKenzie Porter song)
"These Days" (Powderfinger song)
"These Days" (Rascal Flatts song)
"These Days" (Rudimental song)
"These Days" (Take That song)
"These Days" (Alien Ant Farm song)
"These Days" (Foo Fighters song)
"These Days (I Barely Get By)", 1974 song by George Jones
"These Days", by 3 Doors Down from 3 Doors Down
"These Days", by ATB featuring Jeppe Riddervold from Trilogy
"These Days", by Alison Krauss from Paper Airplane
"These Days", by Andrew Cash from Boomtown
"These Days", by Ane Brun from It All Starts with One
"These Days", by Ayọ from Joyful
"These Days", by Bad Astronaut from Houston: We Have a Drinking Problem
"These Days", by The Black Keys from Brothers
"These Days", by Brian Houston from Sugar Queen
"These Days", by Camille O'Sullivan from Changeling
"These Days", by Chantal Kreviazuk
"These Days", by Cheap Trick from The Latest
"These Days", by Cher from Stars
"These Days", by CNBLUE from Code Name Blue
"These Days", by The Crash from Pony Ride
"These Days", by Day After Tomorrow from Primary Colors
"These Days", by Die Kreuzen from Century Days
"These Days", by Diecast from Tearing Down Your Blue Skies
"These Days", by Dogs from Tall Stories from Under the Table
"These Days", by Dr. Dog from Be the Void
"These Days", by Githead from Art Pop
"These Days", by The Hours from See the Light
"These Days", by Jackson Browne, also covered by Nico from Chelsea Girl
"These Days", by Jeanne Balibar from Slalom Dame
"These Days", by The Jesus and Mary Chain from Stoned & Dethroned
"These Days", by Joy Division, B-Side of the single "Love Will Tear Us Apart"
"These Days", by Lennon Murphy from 5:30 Saturday Morning
"These Days", by Lloyd Cole and the Commotions from Mainstream
"These Days", by Machine Gun Fellatio from On Ice
"These Days", by Mandisa from What If We Were Real
"These Days", by Maverick Sabre from Lonely Are the Brave
"These Days", by Mis-Teeq from Lickin' on Both Sides
"These Days", by Nate Dogg from G-Funk Classics, Vol. 1 & 2
"These Days", by Precious from Precious
"These Days", by Radio Moscow from Magical Dirt
"These Days", by R.E.M. from Lifes Rich Pageant
"These Days", by The Rentals from Return of the Rentals
"These Days", by Revive from Trafalgar Street
"These Days", by Richard Fleeshman from Neon
"These Days", by Ron Sexsmith from Cobblestone Runway
"These Days", by Roses Are Red from What Became of Me
"These Days", by Sara Evans from No Place That Far
"These Days", by Times New Viking from Born Again Revisited
"These Days", by Z-Ro from Angel Dust

Literature
 These Days, a poetry collection by Frederick Seidel

See also
One of These Days (disambiguation)
"Some of These Days", a 1910 song written by Shelton Brooks, covered by many artists
 Those Days (disambiguation)